Anakinetica is a genus of brachiopods belonging to the family Terebratellidae.

The species of this genus are found in Australia.

Species:

Anakinetica cumingi 
Anakinetica recta

References

Brachiopod genera